The Schmutter is a river in Bavaria, Germany, a right tributary of the Danube.

The Schmutter flows north, and for several tens of kilometers it flows parallel to the Lech, at only a few km west of the Lech. It flows into the Danube near Donauwörth. Towns along the Schmutter include Fischach, Neusäß, Gablingen and Mertingen.

See also
List of rivers of Bavaria

References

Rivers of Bavaria
Augsburg (district)
Donau-Ries
Rivers of Germany